The Kirat Region is an area of the Himalayas in eastern Nepal which is inhabited by ethnic Kirati people. Currently Province No. 1 of Nepal has been proposed to be named Kirat Pradesh or Kirat State.

History

Kirat Kingdom

List of Kirat kings
List of Kirati kings who ruled in Nepal.

1. Yalamber
2. Pari
3. Skandhar
4. Balamba
5. Hriti
6. Humati
7. Jitedasti
8. Galinja
9. Oysgja
10. Suyarma
11. Papa
12. Bunka
13. Swawnanda
14. Sthunko
15. Jinghri
16. Nane
17. Luka
18. Thor
19. Thoko
20. Verma
21. Guja
22. Pushkar
23. Keshu
24. Suja
25. Sansa
26. Gunam
27. Khimbu
28. Patuka
29. Gasti

See also
 Yakkha
 Sunuwar people
 Limbu people
 Rai people

References

Further reading
 "Himalayan Kirata," Tripura.org.in
 Office of the Nepal Antiquary, Nepal Antiquary, Issue 7, page 22 
 C. Iman Singh 2003, History and culture of Kirat people, Kirat Yakthung Chumlung

External links
 Proposed ethnic states in 2010 incl. Kirat

History of Nepal
Proposed states of Nepal